Edwin Greenwood (1895–1939) was a British screenwriter, novelist and film director.

Selected filmography
Director
 The Fair Maid of Perth (1923)
 Heartstrings (1923)
 The Bells (1923) 20-minute silent film made as part of the "Gems of Literature" film series
 A Woman in Pawn (1927)
 Tesha (1928)
 To What Red Hell (1929)
 The Co-Optimists (1929)

Screenwriter
 The Physician (1928)
 The Love Race (1931)
 The Girl in the Night (1931)
 The Maid of the Mountains (1932)
 Lord Camber's Ladies (1932, produced by Alfred Hitchcock)
 Money Talks (1933)
 East Meets West (1936)
 His Lordship (1936)
 Young and Innocent (1937)

Actor
 Chappy - That's All (1924) – Slim Jim
 Jamaica Inn (1939) – Dandy – Sir Humphrey's Gang (final film role)

Bibliography
Novels
 Skin and Bone (1934) – Published in the US as The Deadly Dowager
 Miracle in the Drawing Room: A Daring and Cynical Novel of the Modern World’s Reaction to an Old-fashioned Miracle (1935)
 Pins and Needles: A Melodrama (1935) – Published in the US as The Fair Devil
 French Farce: A Tale of Gallic Lunacy, Murder and Death (1937)
 Old Goat: A Fantasia on the Theme of Blackmail and Sudden Death (1937)
 Dark Understudy: A Modern Crime Story (1940)

References

External links

1895 births
1939 deaths
British film directors
British male screenwriters
Writers from London
Silent film screenwriters
20th-century British screenwriters